Mudi, Nepal  is a village development committee in Myagdi District in the Dhaulagiri Zone of western-central Nepal. At the time of the 1991 Nepal census it had a population of 2244 people living in 410 individual households.

References

External links
UN map of the municipalities of Myagdi District

Populated places in Myagdi District